Charter 08 is a manifesto initially signed by 303 Chinese dissident intellectuals and human rights activists. It was published on 10 December 2008, the 60th anniversary of the Universal Declaration of Human Rights, adopting its name and style from the anti-Soviet Charter 77 issued by dissidents in Czechoslovakia. Since its release, more than 10,000 people inside and outside China have signed the charter. After unsuccessful reform efforts in 1989 and 1998 by the Chinese democracy movement, Charter 08 was the first challenge to one-party rule that declared the end of one-party rule to be its goal; it has been described as the first one with a unified strategy.

In 2009, one of the authors of Charter 08, Liu Xiaobo, was sentenced to eleven years' imprisonment for "inciting subversion of state power" because of his involvement. A year later, Liu was awarded the 2010 Nobel Peace Prize by the Norwegian Nobel Committee. Seven years later in July 2017, he died of terminal liver cancer in the prison after having been granted medical parole.

Demands
Many of the original signatories were prominent Chinese citizens inside and outside the government, including lawyers; a Tibetan poet and essayist, Woeser; and Bao Tong, a former senior Communist Party official, who all faced a risk of arrest and jail. The Charter calls for 19 changes including an independent legal system, freedom of association, the elimination of one-party rule and privatization of all enterprises and farm land. "All kinds of social conflicts have constantly accumulated and feelings of discontent have risen consistently," it reads. "The current system has become backward to the point that change cannot be avoided." China remains the only large world power to still retain an authoritarian system that so infringes on human rights, it states. "This situation must change! Political democratic reforms cannot be delayed any longer!"

Specific demands are:
Amending the Constitution.
Separation of powers.
Legislative democracy.
An independent judiciary.
Public control of public servants. 
Guarantee of human rights.
Election of public officials.
Abolition of the hukou system.
Freedom of association. 
Freedom of assembly.
Freedom of expression.
Freedom of religion.
Civic education.
Free markets and protection of private property, including privatizing state enterprises and land.
Financial and tax reform.
Social security.
Protection of the environment.
A federated republic.
Truth in reconciliation.

The opening paragraph of the charter states:

Response

China

The Chinese government has said little publicly about the Charter. On 8 December 2008, two days before the 60th anniversary of the United Nations General Assembly's adoption of the Universal Declaration of Human Rights, Liu Xiaobo was detained by police, hours before the online release of the Charter. He was detained and later arrested on 23 June 2009, on charges of "suspicion of inciting the subversion of state power." Several Nobel Laureates wrote a letter to President Hu Jintao asking for his release; in response, the Chinese government suppressed them:  at least 70 of its 303 original signatories were summoned or interrogated by police while domestic media were forbidden to interview anyone who signed the document. Police also searched for or questioned a journalist, Li Datong, and two lawyers, though none were arrested. State media was banned from reporting on the manifesto. A blogging website popular with activists, bullog.cn, which may have had ties to the Charter, was shut down.
On 25 December 2009, Liu Xiaobo was sentenced to 11 years in prison for "inciting subversion of state power" activities by the court. On 8 October 2010, he was awarded the Nobel Peace Prize "for his long and non-violent struggle for fundamental human rights in China".

Outside of China
A number of governments, including those of the United States and Germany, as well as the opposition in Taiwan, have condemned the harassment of supporters of Charter 08 as well as hailing the Charter. Western press has generally covered the Charter positively, and international NGOs have supported its message. David Stanway reported in The Guardian that it "has been hailed as the most significant act of public dissent against China's Communist party since the Tiananmen Square pro-democracy protests were brutally crushed in 1989." Other international figures, including the Dalai Lama, have also voiced their support and admiration of the Charter. There were also protests in Hong Kong demanding the release of Liu Xiaobo and other signatories. The organization that Liu led to pursue Charter 8, received financial support from the US government's National Endowment for Democracy.

Selected signatories and supporters

Original signatories

 Bao Tong
 Tsering Woeser
 Dai Qing
 Ding Zilin
 Liu Junning
 Liu Xiaobo
 Mao Yushi
 Pu Zhiqiang
 Ran Yunfei

Later supporters

 Fang Lizhi
 Ha Jin
 He Weifang
 Su Xiaokang
 Yu Ying-shih
 Wang Dan

See also

Charter 77 (Czechoslovakia)
Charter 97 (Belarus)
Human rights in the People's Republic of China
Law of the People's Republic of China
Fifth Modernization (Wei Jingsheng)

References

External links
Full text of Charter 08: Original Chinese or Original Chinese (pdf), English translation by Perry Link,English translation with postscript by Perry Link, English translation by Human Rights in China
Charter 08 main site (Chinese) -- includes updated news and signature lists
Charter 08 main site (English) -- includes updated news and ability to sign the charter online
"News about Charter 08," China Digital Times
"Chinese Support Charter 08," History News Network
"Over 300 sign 'Charter 08', a manifesto for human rights in China, but some are already arrested," Asia News

 
History of human rights
2008 in China
Political charters
2008 documents